Duped Till Doomsday is a 1957 East German drama film directed by Kurt Jung-Alsen. It was entered into the 1957 Cannes Film Festival.

Plot
Soldiers Wagner, Paulun and Lick are three friends and the best sharpshooters in their division, that is stationed in Latvia, near the German-Soviet border. During June 1941, while on vacation, they walk near a river and spot a movement in the bush. Believing it to be a bird, they shoot in its direction and discover that they have killed Angelika, their captain's daughter. The three throw her corpse to a swamp and proceed as if nothing happened. Lick tells of the incident to his father, a Waffen-SS general, who decides to use the corpse for propaganda purposes: on 22 June, the day of the invasion to the Soviet Union, he exhumes Angelika's remains and claims she was killed by Soviet marauders. Her father orders to shoot Latvian civilians in response. Paulun tries to tell the truth, but Lick claims he is insane; Wagner remains silent. When Paulun tries to escape arrest, he is killed by Lick. Wagner does nothing and continues to behave as usual.

Cast
 Rudolf Ulrich as Wagner
 Wolfgang Kieling as Lick
 Hans-Joachim Martens as Paulun
 Walther Süssenguth as captain 
 Renate Küster as Angelika
 Peter Kiwitt as Waffen-SS General Lick
 Hermann Dieckhoff as division commander
 Kurt Ulrich as lieutenant
 Erich Brauer as staff sergeant
 Hannes Fischer as kitchen sergeant
 Wolfgang Lippert as Voss
 Helga Raumer as innkeeper's daughter
 Fritz Diez as Adolf Hitler (voice) 
 Horst Giese as uncredited role

Production
The script was adapted from the 1955-published novel Kameraden by Franz Fühmann. Fühmann himself was excluded from participating in the production. The picture was the first of the "army epics", a new East German genre that reformed the classic German style of portraying military comradeship, replacing the typical soldiery friendship with plots centered on moral dilemmas facing the servicemen. In addition, the picture was intended as a response to the war films produced in the West at those years.

Reception
Betrogen bis zum jüngsten Tag was the first East German film to be entered into the Cannes Film Festival; a year earlier, at 1956, Zar und Zimmermann and Der Teufelskreis were screened outside the competition. Although the picture had no chance of winning due to political considerations, it was nominated for the Palme d'Or.

The film was DEFA's most successful project since the 1946 Murderers Among Us.  It was well received abroad. The Punch magazine's reviewer wrote that it was "very worth seeing... mostly admirable, flowed in the end." The East German media called it "the first DEFA war film" and praised it. Fühmann's work received considerable attention due to the film, and his books were re-printed.

References

External links

Betrogen bis zum jüngsten Tag on PROGRESS' website.

1957 films
1957 drama films
German drama films
East German films
1950s German-language films
German black-and-white films
Films directed by Kurt Jung-Alsen
Films about Nazi Germany
1950s German films